The International Centre for Mathematical Sciences (ICMS) is a mathematical research centre based in Edinburgh. According to its website, the centre is "designed to bring together mathematicians and practitioners in science, industry and commerce for research workshops and other meetings."

The centre was jointly established in 1990 by the University of Edinburgh and Heriot-Watt University, under the supervision of Professor Elmer Rees, with initial support from Edinburgh District Council, the Scottish Development Agency and the International Centre for Theoretical Physics.

In April 1994 the Centre moved to 14 India Street, Edinburgh, the birthplace of James Clerk Maxwell and home of the James Clerk Maxwell Foundation. In 2010 it was relocated to 15 South College Street to accommodate larger events. As of 2020, the ICMS is located within the newly established Bayes centre.

The current scientific director (appointed in 2016) is Professor Paul Glendinning. The ICMS is a member of the European Mathematical Society.

Premises 
From April 1994, the Centre rented from the James Clerk Maxwell Foundation accommodation at 14, India Street, the birthplace of James Clerk Maxwell. Increased activity necessitated removal in 2010 to a converted church in South College Street, and then in 2018 to its present location in the nearby Bayes Centre of the University of Edinburgh.

See also
Edinburgh Mathematical Society
Isaac Newton Institute, Cambridge

References

External links
ICMS Web Site

Mathematics education in the United Kingdom
International research institutes for mathematics
Research institutes in the United Kingdom